5259 Epeigeus  is a mid-sized Jupiter trojan from the Greek camp, approximately  in diameter. It was discovered on 30 January 1989, by American astronomer couple Carolyn and Eugene Shoemaker at the Palomar Observatory in California. The D-type asteroid has a rotation period of 18.4 hours. It was named after the Myrmidon hero Epeigeus from Greek mythology.

Orbit and classification 

Epeigeus is a dark Jovian asteroid in a 1:1 orbital resonance with Jupiter. It is located in the leading Greek camp at the Gas Giant's  Lagrangian point, 60° ahead on its orbit . It is also a non-family asteroid of the Jovian background population.

It orbits the Sun at a distance of 4.8–5.6 AU once every 11 years and 10 months (4,332 days; semi-major axis of 5.2 AU). Its orbit has an eccentricity of 0.07 and an inclination of 16° with respect to the ecliptic.

The body's observation arc begins with a precovery taken at the Siding Spring Observatory in March 1980, almost 8 years prior to its official discovery observation at Palomar.

Physical characteristics 

In the SDSS-based taxonomy, Epeigeus is a D-type asteroid. It has also been characterized as a D-type by Pan-STARRS' survey. It is the most common spectral type among the Jupiter trojans.

Rotation period 

In August 1995, a rotational lightcurve of Epeigeus was obtained from photometric observations over five consecutive nights by Italian astronomer Stefano Mottola using the Bochum 0.61-metre Telescope at ESO's La Silla Observatory in Chile. Lightcurve analysis gave a rotation period of  hours with a low brightness amplitude of 0.10 magnitude.

Diameter and albedo 

According to the surveys carried out by the Infrared Astronomical Satellite IRAS, the Japanese Akari satellite and the NEOWISE mission of NASA's Wide-field Infrared Survey Explorer, Epeigeus measures between 42.59 and 44.74 kilometers in diameter and its surface has an albedo between 0.069 and 0.074.

The Collaborative Asteroid Lightcurve Link derives an albedo of 0.0738 and a diameter of 42.59 kilometers based on an absolute magnitude of 10.3.

Naming 

This minor planet was named from Greek mythology after the Greek warrior Epeigeus, who belonged to the Myrmidons commanded by Achilles. He was killed by Hector, who hit him upon the crest of his helmet with a great stone. The official naming citation was published by the Minor Planet Center on 12 July 1995.

References

External links 
 Asteroid Lightcurve Database (LCDB), query form (info )
 Dictionary of Minor Planet Names, Google books
 Discovery Circumstances: Numbered Minor Planets (5001)-(10000) – Minor Planet Center
 Asteroid 5259 Epeigeus at the Small Bodies Data Ferret
 
 

005259
Discoveries by Carolyn S. Shoemaker
Discoveries by Eugene Merle Shoemaker
Named minor planets
19890130